Lango is a community of Paranilotic languages-speaking people originating in South Sudan. They are nomadic agriculturists and Pastoralists. The Lango live in the Ikwoto County area of Eastern Equatoria State. This region borders Uganda to the South and their inhabitants are sharing ancestral lines with the Lango and Acholi of Uganda.

Composition 
The Lango are Lorwama and Lokwa people, who are predominantly found around Lofus and Ikotos.  The name of the tribe Lorwama came to an existence in 2010 and was declared by Josephine Akulang Abalang, who is an immigrant from Logir of the Kedus family.  The Lorwama are immigrants largely from Lokwa and Otuho tribes.  The word Lorwama was coined by the Ketebo during peace conference in 1923.  Before the signing of that peace, the Ketebo fought fiercely with pockets of Acholis who were coming to occupy the current Lofus as hunters and coupled with abduction of the Ketebo for slave trade during the Mahdia war (Manatong).  However, during the peace ceremony, the Ketebo came with tafa (Ugali/Posho) made from millet and they asked those who were administering the ritual whether it is allowed for them to eat the roasted meat with Ugali, but they were told no but rather to surrender all that ugali to the leadership of the ritual.  After words, the Ketebo found that their ugali is being ate by the protagonists (Acholi and Lokwa) and the Ketebo told them you are "Lorwama" because you lied to us that we cannot eat the meat with tafa (ugali).   Before 2010, the Ketebo called the Lorwama "Ogire" because they are largely from Lokwa and their clans include Itibok, Lotuho, Igago etc, which can be traced to the Lokwa (Orgire) and Lotuho.  The Lorwama as stated by the late chief Abondio, the father of Ingong in 2006, he stated clearly to the Ketebo that, this land belongs to your ancestors like Chief Munyomoi from the Ikai clan. He said they immigrated to Lofus in mid 1920s from Ikotos.  The word Lofus is a Ketebo word "Loofus" meaning the "leader".  The current language spoken in Lofus or by Lorwama is Oketeboi which has been mixed with Dongotono.  

Unfortunately, Lokwa is one of the tribe but now claiming to be Lango.  The word Lango came from the Acholi or Luo meaning "enemy, alien or foreigner".  During the demarcation of Africa in 1914 especially in Uganda by the British Colonial, when the surveyors reach in Madi Opei, they asked the Acholi that what about that mountains pointing to Lonyili and Ingeretenya "Tseretenya" and the Acholi chief said, not the people living in those mountains are Lango, meaning they are not the Acholi but foreigners/aliens/enemy.  The Acholi also called the Karamojong "Lango Diang".

Alternative spellings
The name "Lango" can also be spelled as Langgo or Langoni when referring to a male, or as Langoni for a female.

External links
Gurtong Peace Project - South Sudanese Communities

Ethnic groups in South Sudan